Joseph Edward Mahoney (born February 1, 1987) is an American former Major League Baseball (MLB) first baseman who played for the Baltimore Orioles and Miami Marlins in 2012 and 2013.

College career
Mahoney attended Catholic Central High School in Troy, New York and the University of Richmond. While with Richmond in 2005, he hit .268 with nine home runs and 41 RBI. In 2006, he hit .356 with five home runs and 49 RBI. After the 2006 season, he played collegiate summer baseball with the Orleans Cardinals of the Cape Cod Baseball League. In 2007, his final year at Richmond, he hit .305 with 17 home runs, 62 RBI and 16 stolen bases. In 2004, he took Amsterdam Rams pitcher Kyle Cetnar deep over the center field wall for a mammoth home run blast. This is still considered one of the longest home runs in Big 10 history and school history at CCHS.

Professional career

Baltimore Orioles
He was drafted by the Baltimore Orioles in the sixth round of the 2007 amateur draft and began his professional career that season.

With the Aberdeen IronBirds in 2007, Mahoney hit .269 with nine home runs and 44 RBI in 65 games. The following year, with the Delmarva Shorebirds, Mahoney hit .222 with seven home runs and 61 RBI in 95 games. In 2009, Mahoney played for the Shorebirds and Frederick Keys, hitting a combined .278 with eight home runs, 58 RBI and 29 stolen bases. He played for the Keys and Bowie Baysox in 2010, hitting .307 with 18 home runs, 78 RBI and 13 stolen bases.  He won the Orioles 2010 Brooks Robinson Minor League Player of the Year Award.

Miami Marlins
Mahoney was claimed off waivers by the Miami Marlins on November 30, 2012. He was outrighted off the roster to AAA New Orleans Zephyrs on October 4, 2013. On November 4, 2013, he elected free agency.

References

External links

1987 births
Living people
Baltimore Orioles players
Miami Marlins players
Baseball players from New York (state)
Aberdeen IronBirds players
Delmarva Shorebirds players
Frederick Keys players
Bowie Baysox players
Norfolk Tides players
Richmond Spiders baseball players
Major League Baseball first basemen
Jupiter Hammerheads players
New Orleans Zephyrs players
Orleans Firebirds players